The Air Track may also refer to a breakdance move.
See also AirTrack (disambiguation) for other uses.

An air track is a scientific device used to study motion in a low friction environment. Its name comes from its structure: air is pumped through a hollow track with fine holes all along the track that allows specially fitted air track cars to glide relatively friction-free. Air tracks are usually triangular in cross-section. Carts which have a triangular base and fit neatly on to the top of the track are used to study motion in low friction environments.

The air track is also used to study collisions, both elastic and inelastic. Since there is very little energy lost through friction it is easy to demonstrate how momentum is conserved before and after a collision.  The track can be used to calculate the force of gravity when placed at an angle.

It was invented in the mid-1960s at the California Institute of Technology by Prof Nehr and Leighton. It was first presented by them at a meeting of the American Physical Society in NYC in 1965(?) where it was viewed by Prof John Stull, Alfred University, and Frank Ferguson, the Ealing Corporation. The original track was about 1 meter long with tiny air orifices and highly compressed air.  Stull returned to Alfred University, where he developed a simple version using standard square aluminum tubing with large air orifices and air from the  vent of a shop vacuum cleaner. With Ferguson's help at Ealing, Stull designed a custom aluminum track that Ealing offered commercially in various lengths up to 10 meters. T. Walley Williams III at Ealing extended the concept to the 2-dimensional air table in 1969.

References

Measuring instruments